Jamus Jerome Lim Chee Wui (born 1976) is a Singaporean politician, economist and associate professor. A member of the opposition Workers' Party (WP), he has been the Member of Parliament (MP) representing the Anchorvale division of Sengkang GRC since 2020.

Early life and career
Lim attended Catholic High School, Raffles Institution and Raffles Junior College as part of his early education in Singapore. His first job involved him working at Burger King. He was a service medic in the Singapore Armed Forces (SAF) during his National Service (NS).

Lim graduated from the University of Southern Queensland in 1998 with a Bachelor of Business degree in economics. He then obtained a Master of Science degree in economics from the London School of Economics in 2000, and went on to the University of California, Santa Cruz, where he graduated in 2006 with a Master of Arts degree in politics and a PhD in international economics.  In 2018, Lim graduated from Harvard University with a Master of Liberal Arts degree in history.

Lim started his career at JP Morgan, before working at the World Bank for seven years, from 2007 to 2014, serving in its Development Prospects Group and specialising in long-term macroeconomic projections. He was an economist at the Institute for Southeast Asian Studies and the Abu Dhabi Investment Authority. In 2018, he joined the Singapore-based independent investment management firm Thirdrock. Lim is an associate professor of economics at ESSEC Business School in Singapore. On 23 July 2020, Lim was elected to the council of the Economic Society of Singapore (ESS).

Political career

Lim became a member of the Workers' Party (WP) in September 2019, having previously volunteered in the party's grassroots activities. 

On 30 June 2020, he was announced as part of a four-member WP team contesting in the newly-formed Sengkang GRC in the 2020 general election.

On 1 July 2020, Lim engaged in a televised political debate with Francis Yuen of the Progress Singapore Party, Chee Soon Juan of the Singapore Democratic Party and Minister Vivian Balakrishnan of the governing People's Action Party. His performance at the debate was well-received, with PN Balji of The New Paper writing that he was "smelling of roses" and Toh Wen Li of The Straits Times describing Lim as the "star candidate" of the Workers' Party.

On 10 July 2020, following the results of the 2020 general election, Lim and his team were elected into Parliament after securing 52.13% of the vote, defeating the governing People's Action Party in an upset victory that secured a second group representation constituency for the opposition. 

On 3 September 2020, Lim gave his maiden speech in Parliament. He asserted that there was "insufficient compassion in our policymaking process" and proposed that Singapore could implement a "simple, across-the-board minimum wage".

On 27 December 2020, Lim was elected as Deputy Head of the Policy Research Team at the WP's Central Executive Committee (CEC).

Personal life
Lim has a sister, Jerraine, who is seven years younger than him. In his younger days, Lim was a rugby player, drummer, and self-declared "Solitaire junkie". His father died on 24 February 1999 at the age of 49.

Lim married Chilean-American writer Eneida Patricia Alcalde on 8 November 2010. They have a daughter who was born in November 2019.

Selected works and publications

References

External links
 Workers' Party biography 
 Jamus Lim on Parliament of Singapore

Living people
21st-century Singaporean politicians
21st-century scholars
Harvard University alumni
Harvard Extension School alumni
Alumni of the London School of Economics
University of Southern Queensland alumni
University of California, Santa Cruz alumni
Workers' Party (Singapore) politicians
Raffles Institution alumni
1976 births
Members of the Parliament of Singapore
Alumni of the University of London